Mozaffariyeh (also Romanized as Moz̧affarīyeh; also known as Moz̧affarī and Muzzafari) is a village in Kut-e Abdollah Rural District, in the Central District of Karun County, Khuzestan Province, Iran. At the 2006 census, its population was 1,104, in 204 families. The village was chosen as the capital of Kut-e Abdollah Rural District when  the previous capital, Bahar separated and was part of Muran Rural District which was created on January 23, 2013.

References 

Populated places in Karun County